The Hillman Avenger is a rear-wheel drive small family car originally manufactured by the former Rootes division of Chrysler Europe from 1970–1978, badged from 1976 onward as the Chrysler Avenger. Between 1979 and 1981 it was manufactured by PSA Peugeot Citroën and badged as the Talbot Avenger. The Avenger was marketed in North America as the Plymouth Cricket and was the first Plymouth to have a four-cylinder engine since the 1932 Plymouth Model PB was discontinued.

The Avenger was initially produced at Rootes' plant in Ryton-on-Dunsmore, England, and later at the company's Linwood facility near Glasgow, Scotland.

1970: Hillman Avenger
Introduced in February 1970, the Avenger was significant as it was the first and last car to be developed by Rootes after the Chrysler takeover in 1967. Stylistically, the Avenger was undoubtedly very much in tune with its time; the American-influenced "Coke Bottle" waistline and semi-fastback rear-end being a contemporary styling cue, indeed the Avenger would be the first British car to be manufactured with a one piece plastic front grille. It was similar in appearance to the larger Ford Cortina#TC Mark III (1970–1976), which was launched later in 1970.

However, from an engineering perspective it was rather conventional, using a 4-cylinder all-iron overhead valve engine in 1250 or 1500 capacities driving a coil spring suspended live axle at the rear wheels. Unlike any previous Rootes design, there were no "badge-engineered" Humber or Singer versions in the UK market. The Avenger was immediately highly praised by the press for its good handling characteristics and generally good overall competence on the road and it was considered a significantly better car to drive than contemporaries like the Morris Marina.

Initially, the Avenger was available as a four-door saloon in DL, Super and GL trim levels. The DL and Super could be had with either the 1250 or 1500 cc engines, but the GL was only available with the 1500 cc engine. Since the DL was the basic model in the range, it featured little more than rubber mats and a very simple dashboard with a strip-style speedometer. The Super was a bit better equipped, featuring carpets, armrests, twin horns and reversing lights, though the dashboard was carried over from the DL. The top-spec GL model featured four round headlights (which was a big improvement over the rectangular ones from the Hillman Hunter that were used on the DL and Super), internal bonnet release, two-speed wipers, brushed nylon seat trim (previously never used on British cars), reclining front seats, and a round-dial dashboard with extra instrumentation.

Not only was the Avenger's styling totally new, but so were the engine and transmission units, which were not at all like those used in the larger "Arrow" series Hunter. The Avenger was a steady seller in the 1970s, in competition with the Ford Escort and Vauxhall Viva. Chrysler was attempting to make the Avenger to be a "world car", and took the ambitious step of marketing the Avenger as the Plymouth Cricket in the U.S. Complaints of rust, unreliability, plus the general unpopularity of smaller cars on the American market, saw it withdrawn from that market after only two years.

Introduction of body and trim variations

In October 1970, the Avenger GT was added to the range. It had a twin-carburettor 1500 cc engine, four-speed manual or three-speed automatic transmission (also optional on the 1500 DL, Super and GL). The GT featured twin round headlights, go-faster stripes along the sides of the doors and "dustbin lid" wheel covers, which were similar to those found on the various Datsuns and Toyotas of the 1970s.

The basic fleet Avenger was added to the range in February 1972. It was offered with either 1250 or 1500 cc engines (the latter available with the automatic transmission option). The fleet Avenger was very basic: it did not have a sun visor for the front passenger, and the heater blower had just a single speed. In October 1972, the Avenger GT was replaced by the Avenger GLS, which came with a vinyl roof and Rostyle sports wheels.

In March 1972, the five-door estate versions were introduced, in DL and Super forms (both available with either 1250 or 1500 cc engines) and basically the same specifications as the saloon versions.

The two-door saloon models were added in March 1973, with all engine and trim options of the existing four-door range. Styling of the two-door was similar to the four-door, but the side profile was less curvaceous.

The car was extensively marketed in continental Europe, first as a Sunbeam. It was without the Avenger name in France, where it was known as the Sunbeam 1250 and 1500; later the 1300 and 1600. Some northern European markets received the car as the Sunbeam Avenger.

Both engine sizes were upgraded in October 1973. The 1250 became the 1300, while the 1500 became the 1600 with nearly all the same previous trim levels except for the basic fleet Avenger, which was discontinued at this point. The GL and GT trim levels were now also offered with the 1300 engine and two-door saloon body.

1971–1973: Plymouth Cricket for North America

In North America, a rebadged variant of the Avenger was marketed as the Plymouth Cricket through Plymouth dealers as a captive import in 4-door saloon and 5-door station wagon variants. It had 9.5" front disc brakes and 8" rear drums. Brochures included a cartoon cricket, possibly trying to capitalize on the popularity of the VW Beetle.

A Chrysler Plymouth press release dated 30 June 1970 said the Cricket would be presented to the automotive press in November 1970. The first shipment of 280 Crickets from the UK arrived in the U.S. on 20 November 1970. Another press release issued on 23 February 1972 stated that the station wagon version would debut in early spring of 1972.

The 1500 cc engine was offered on the Plymouth Cricket. Side marker lamps (US DOT required) were added, and front disc brakes were standardized; these were originally optional in the UK. The single carburetor / manual choke combination was standard. From 1972, the single carburetor / automatic choke combination, dual carburettors, and air conditioning were all options.

In both the USA and Canada, federal motor vehicle safety standards required the round four-headlight grille of the GL and GT model Avengers.

The Cricket was discontinued during the 1973 model year despite a sharp increase in demand for small cars in North America brought on by the gas crisis of 1973. The success of the similarly-sized Dodge Colt captive import, built by Mitsubishi Motors, doomed the Cricket. With the Colt selling much better than the Cricket, re-engineering the Cricket to meet new 1974 U.S. safety and emissions standards did not make financial sense. The last Crickets were exported to the U.S. in late 1972 but were sold as 1973 models, as U.S. safety and emission laws were applied according to the calendar year when a car was manufactured or imported, as opposed to the model year when it was sold.

A total of 27,682 Plymouth Crickets were sold in the U.S. During the same time period, the competing Ford Pinto and Chevrolet Vega each outsold the Cricket by a margin exceeding 10:1.

The Cricket nameplate continued in Canada, when Chrysler Canada replaced the British-built Plymouth Cricket with a rebadged Dodge Colt in mid-1973 model year. The Cricket's version of the Colt GT was called the Cricket Formula S. For the 1975 model year, the Plymouth Cricket was rebadged as the Plymouth Colt. Thus began Chrysler Canada's dual marketing system for this car, selling the Colt as both a Dodge and a Plymouth. The later Plymouth Arrow was similarly sold as a Dodge Arrow.

1972: Hillman Avenger Tiger 

Named to evoke memories of the Sunbeam Tiger, the Avenger Tiger concept began as a publicity exercise. Avenger Super (four-door) cars were modified by the Chrysler Competitions Centre under Des O'Dell and the Tiger model was launched in March 1972. Modifications included the 1500 GT engine with an improved cylinder head with enlarged valves, twin Weber carburetors and a compression ratio of 9.4:1. The engine now developed  at 6,100 rpm. The suspension was also uprated, whilst brakes, rear axle, and gearbox are directly from the GT.

A distinctive yellow colour scheme ("Sundance") with a bonnet bulge, rear spoiler and side stripes was standard, set off with "Avenger Tiger" lettering on the rear quarters.

These figures beat the rival Ford Escort Mexico, but fuel consumption was heavy. Even in 1972, the Tiger developed a reputation for its thirst.

All Avenger Tigers were assembled by the Chrysler Competitions Centre and production figures are vague but around 200 of the initial Mark 1 seems likely.

In October 1972, Chrysler unveiled the more "productionised" Mark 2 Tiger. The Avenger GL bodyshell with four round headlights was used. Mechanically identical to the earlier cars(from contemporary road tests, however,there were better performances and fuel consumption), the bonnet bulge was lost although the bonnet turned matt black, and there were changes to wheels and seats. These cars went on sale at £1,350. Production was around 400. Red ("Wardance") was now available as well as yellow ("Sundance"), both with black detailing.

1976–1979: Chrysler Avenger

In September 1976, the Avenger was rebadged as a Chrysler. It also gained a comprehensive facelift which included a new frontal treatment and a new dashboard. Both treatments looked similar to those of the Chrysler Alpine. The greatest change was at the rear where, on the saloons, the distinctive "hockey-stick" rear lamp clusters were dropped in favour of a straight "light-bar" arrangement. The top of the former "hockey-sticks" had metal plates in their place, whilst the fuel cap was moved from the rear to the right hand side of the car.

Three trim levels were available, LS, GL (known as 'Super' in certain markets) and GLS—the GLS being only available in a high-compression 1.6 L form.

From the beginning of production in 1970, the Avenger's bodyshell components had been manufactured at Linwood, and then transported south to Ryton on the component trains used to move materials for the Hillman Imp north to Linwood.  Following the Imp's discontinuation in 1976, the Avenger production line was moved from Ryton to Linwood where it was produced until the end of its UK production life., whilst Ryton was switched over to producing the Simca-based Chrysler Alpine and later the Talbot Solara.

1979–1981: Talbot Avenger

Following the collapse of Chrysler Europe in 1978, and its takeover by PSA Peugeot Citroën, the Avenger was re-badged with the resurrected Talbot brand with the Avenger remaining in production alongside the hatchback-only Horizon to meet the demand which remained for traditional saloons and estates in this sector. Unlike newer Talbot models such as the Horizon, the Avenger and Sunbeam retained the Chrysler "Pentastar" badge, instead of the Talbot logo featuring a letter "T" inside a circle – this was because Chrysler had retained the rights to the Avenger and Sunbeam models after the sale of Chrysler Europe to PSA, who only had purchased the rights to the Simca-based Alpine and Horizon. Production continued until the middle of 1981, when PSA closed the Linwood production plant and concentrated all British production at the Ryton plant. The Avenger was discontinued with no direct replacement – the Peugeot 305, introduced in 1977, was the closest car to the Avenger's size in PSA's lineup; although the slightly larger Talbot Solara (a saloon version of the Alpine/Simca 1307) had been introduced shortly before the Avenger's demise.

Chrysler retained ownership of the "Avenger" trademark, subsequently used on the Dodge Avenger 2007–2014.

International production
Chrysler's operations in various countries around the world also marketed (and in some cases assembled) the car. In South Africa, the car—like the larger Hunter assembled there—used Peugeot engines and was badged as a Dodge rather than a Hillman, while in New Zealand the car, assembled from CKD kits by importer Todd Motors (later Mitsubishi Motors NZ), was available initially in 4-door and, later, 5-door estate forms.

Denmark and Europe
In Denmark, the versions being sold were:
 1300 (2-door saloon, 4-door saloon, 5-door estate car)
 1300 GL (2-door saloon, 4-door saloon, 5-door estate car)
 1600 GL (2-door saloon, 4-door saloon, 5-door estate car)
 1600 GLS (4-door saloon, 5-door estate car)
 1600 GT (2-door saloon, 4-door saloon)

These Danish versions had two-door equivalents which were sometimes exported back to the UK, since two-door models were phased out in the UK market in 1979. The Hillman Avenger name was not used, instead the cars were simply badged as Sunbeam and the engine size and trim level (e.g. Sunbeam 1600 GLS).

Throughout most of Europe the Sunbeam name was used, except for the Netherlands, Italy and Spain.

Argentina

The Avenger was built in Argentina between 1971 and 1990, initially as the Dodge 1500 (or Dodge 1500M with the 1.8 engine) as a four-door sedan.

In 1977, the Dodge 1500 GT-100 producing  was introduced. It had the 1800 engine, two Stromberg carburettors, a  diameter clutch and a high performance manifold. This model could be had only in dark blue or black with obligatory sports stripes. In 1978, the first station wagon (estate version)–Dodge 1500 Rural–were announced. Later on, the Rural was only available with the 1.8 liter engine, albeit still using the "1500" name.

In the beginning of 1980 Volkswagen acquired Chrysler International's remaining shares in their Argentinian subsidiary when the latter withdrew from South America (Volkswagen held 49% since earlier). The deal included the tooling to the Dodge 1500. The Chrysler range was discontinued, but the Dodge 1500 continued with a new "Serie W" suffix. In 1982 the car was renamed the Volkswagen 1500 (not to be confused with the totally different Volkswagen Type 3, which had been sold elsewhere in the world between 1961 and 1973 as a Volkswagen 1500 too).

Under Volkswagen, the car received its final facelift, gaining a sloping front grille which was more in vogue in the early 1980s. Details such as the rearview mirrors and doorhandles were replaced by squared-off units in black plastic, rather than the earlier chromed filigrane ones. Production ended in 1990, replaced with the more modern Volkswagen Gacel/Senda, with a total of 262,668 units sold in its almost 20-year lifespan. This vehicle was very popular with taxi drivers, but by the end of 1998 they had all fallen foul of the ten-year age rule on Argentine taxi vehicles. It was also very popular in the early TC 2000 touring car racing series, winning the 1980, 1981 and 1982 championships.

Brazil

The Avenger was also built in Brazil from 1973 until 1981 in two-door sedan form only, sold initially as Dodge 1800, named for its motor — the engine design was the same as found in Avengers sold elsewhere, although enlarged to a 1.8 L capacity. Styling was completely different from the British built Avengers (which only arrived four months later), with the bodywork from the A-pillar back being unique. The differences are very small, with the rear side window being somewhat larger and the overall appearance being slightly less curvy than the British model. More obvious is the use of larger bumpers, a four-headlamp grille (which was different from the design found on the quadruple headlamp Avengers and the American Plymouth Cricket), and conventional tail lights, which did not have the "hockeystick" shape of the Hillman Avenger. It was presented at the São Paulo Motor Show in November 1972.

In 1976, the car was renamed Dodge Polara (a nameplate Chrysler previously used on full-sized Dodge models in the U.S. and on a series of large Dodges in Argentina), and underwent a comprehensive facelift (in 1978), gaining the Chrysler Avenger's front styling, and dashboard setup, the revised bumpers and tail light treatments remaining unique to Brazil. A further light facelift was given in 1980 before production ceased in 1981.

New Zealand
The Avenger was sold by Todd Motors in New Zealand from 1970–1980 in four-door sedan and five-door wagon (1975 onward) forms only. Todd's of Petone and, later, Porirua also sold Chrysler Australia and Mitsubishi products and their assembly lines both at the original Petone plant (dating from the 1920s) and the new purpose-built plant opened in Porirua in 1974 were notable for the variety of models coming down the twin final assembly lines at any one time—vehicles sharing the trim lines with the Avenger on a daily shift might include the Hillman Hunter, Chrysler Valiant and Alpine hatchback, Mitsubishi Galant, Mirage and Lancer, as well as the Datsun 180B (due to Todd Motors for a time having a contract to build those as Nissan's other contractor at the time, Campbell Motor Industries, did not have enough capacity).

The New Zealand Avenger initially was similar to the British line but there was just one engine and trim level to start: the 'Super' (two headlights, vinyl trim, 1.5 L single carburettor engine, manual 4-speed gearbox.). In 1971 Todd's added a unique-to-NZ, sporty, 1.5-litre twin-carburettor 'TC' model with all-black interior trim, dashtop rev counter, side striping, high-back 'tombstone' front seats, special bright paint colours and new wheel trims, among other detail changes. This was loosely based on the UK GT but lacked that car's 'Rostyle' wheels, using locally-made, look-alike pressed aluminium wheel trims instead.

The TC was effectively replaced in 1973 by the more upmarket Avenger Alpine, another local special loosely based on the UK 'GL' (four headlights, four-round-dials dashboard instead of a rectangular instrument cluster (though early cars had a blanked-off space instead of the rev counter standardised later), better trim, twin carburettors and vinyl roof), initially with the twin-carburettor 1.5 L engine (changed to a 1.6 L from 1973, later changed again to a single-carb unit and also available for the first time with automatic transmission, the Borg Warner 45 four-speed unit). The Super sedan also gained the 1.6 L engine and auto option in '73 while the range was expanded in 1975 when 1.3 L variants (a result of the fuel crisis that also prompted rival Ford New Zealand to reintroduce a Cortina 1.3) and 1.6 L manual or automatic 'Super' wagon models were added to the New Zealand assembled range.

Todd's updated its Avenger line in 1978 with the Simca-style front end and dashboard and new tail lights, and added a luxury GLS version, similar to the UK model, in place of the earlier Alpine while the range was rebranded Chrysler Avenger. It again broadly followed the British lineup, albeit with a limited range of models, now consisting of a 1.3 GL sedan, a 1.6 LS wagon (marketed as Avenger Estate) and 1.6 GLS sedans, again with manual or automatic transmissions. The 'base' 1.3 GL sedan was a very popular entry level B-category model for rental car company Avis right up to the Avenger's demise in 1980.

While Avenger models in Europe were rebranded as Talbot, the New Zealand Avengers kept the Chrysler branding for 1980. 1980 models could be identified by a black grille, protective black body-side mouldings, window blackouts and unadorned steel wheels.

An unusual variant unique to New Zealand, available for some years, was a "van", basically the manual Avenger wagon with a flat rear floor in place of rear seats and fixed, rather than wind-down, rear door windows. This, and rival models, was introduced around 1975 to get around strict post-oil crisis government hire purchase laws in the country that required a 60 per cent deposit for a new car with only 12-month terms versus 25 per cent and three years for a light commercial vehicle, which is what these so-called "vans" were classified as.

Unlike British models, all New Zealand Avengers from 1973 onwards had metric instruments.

Along with the 1971–1979 Vauxhall HC Viva, 1965–1971 FB and FC Victors, and 1976–1981 Vauxhall Chevette ranges, and Austin Allegro, Maxi and Princess, the Avenger was one of several British models to be sold in New Zealand but not Australia. The Avenger was planned initially as a Hillman Hunter replacement for Australia but, due to economics of sourcing, the Japanese Mitsubishi Galant was chosen instead by Chrysler Australia for that market, though it was marketed as the 'Chrysler Galant'. By contrast in New Zealand, the Avenger, Hunter and Mitsubishi Galant (offered from 1972–1977 in coupe form only) co-existed together in Todd Motors' overall lineup, though the Avenger-sized (but much more cramped inside) Mitsubishi Lancer eventually went into local assembly in 1975.

South Africa
The Avenger was assembled and sold in South Africa badged as the Dodge Avenger. To satisfy local content rules a locally made 1.6 L Peugeot engine, shared with the locally assembled Peugeot 404, was used. The Avenger was available from 1975 until its discontinuation in 1976, when it was renamed as a Chrysler. After Chrysler ZA was merged into Sigma Motor Corporation in 1976, the Avenger was soon cancelled to allow SIGMA to free up more production capacity for the Mazda 323.

Iran
The Avenger was built in Iran from 1978–1980 in two-door,  form by Iran Khodro Co. and called the Hillman Avenger aside the locally manufactured Hillman Hunter (called Paykan). The engine used in it was the Hunter engine also used in the Paykan. The 4-door Avenger was imported to Iran for a few years starting in 1975.

Uruguay
An Avenger-based coupe utility (pickup) called the Dodge 1500 Pickup was made in Uruguay, but the conversion failed to properly account for structural rigidity and they literally broke apart.

1977: Chrysler Sunbeam hatchback

In 1977, a hatchback variant was introduced, known as the Chrysler Sunbeam. This was based on a shortened version of the Avenger's floorplan, and was intended to compete in the lower "supermini" class. It also shared doors with the 2-door Avenger. Initially three engines were available: a 928 cc Hillman Imp-derived unit and 1300 and 1600 Avenger units. A sporty "Ti" version was soon introduced, also with a 1600 engine.

The model's name was a revival of the Rootes Sunbeam marque, which had recently been killed off along with the final Sunbeam model, the Rapier.

In 1979, Chrysler unveiled the Sunbeam Lotus at the Geneva Motor Show. Developed in conjunction with Lotus with rallying in mind (because none of the existing models were competitive) and using a 2200 cc Lotus engine, the road-going version of the rally car was not actually ready for delivery to the public until after the Peugeot buyout, and thus became the Talbot Sunbeam Lotus. At first, these were produced mostly in Lotus' then tobacco-sponsorship colours of black and silver, although later models came in a turquoise and silver scheme.

Avenger and Cricket in motorsport
Despite the humble underpinnings, the Avenger was a successful car in motorsport; it was a frequent strong achiever in the British Saloon Car Championship owing to the "tuneability" of its engine. The road-going version, the 4-door Avenger Tiger, is now a sought-after classic car.
 In the U.S., driver Scott Harvey was known to have rallied a Plymouth Cricket to win the Press on Regardless Rally of 1971.
 Northern Ireland based Robin Eyre-Maunsell was a works driver for the factory Avenger rally team, run by Des O'Dell, and won the British Group 1 Rally Championship in 1975 and 1976.
 The late Bernard Unett won the British Saloon Car Championship using Avengers in 1974, 1976 and 1977.
 Scottish rallydriver Andrew Cowan won the 1976 Heatway Rally of New Zealand in a Hillman Avenger 2-door in 1976, fitted with the expanded 1800 cc Brazilian Dodge 1800/Polara engine.

Survival rate
The Avenger was one of the most popular British cars of the 1970s, although by the end of the decade its popularity was falling, probably due to the arrival of more modern competitors like the Volkswagen Golf, although Chrysler Europe had launched the more modern Horizon to compete in the same market sector as the Avenger. In February 2016, it was reported that just 260 examples of the Avenger were still on Britain's roads.

References

External links

 Avenger/Cricket/Sunbeam page at Allpar.com
 Avenger web page
 Brief history, with illustration, of the Sunbeam Lotus

Avenger
Sunbeam Avenger
Cars introduced in 1970
1980s cars
Touring cars
Station wagons
Cars discontinued in 1990